Balado railway station served the villages of Balado and Cleish in the Scottish county of Perth and Kinross. It was located on a line which ran from Alloa railway station to Kinross Junction.

History

Opened by the Devon Valley Railway, it became part of the North British Railway and so into the London and North Eastern Railway. The line then passed on to the Scottish Region of British Railways on nationalisation in 1948. The station was then closed by the British Railways Board.

The site today

Part of the platform still remains.

References

Bibliography

External links
Railscot on Devon Vale Railway
Station on navigable O. S. map

Disused railway stations in Perth and Kinross
Railway stations in Great Britain opened in 1863
Railway stations in Great Britain closed in 1964
Beeching closures in Scotland
Former North British Railway stations
1863 establishments in Scotland
1964 disestablishments in Scotland